Ivan Antonovich Oleynikov (born 24 August 1998) is a Russian football player who plays for FC Akhmat Grozny.

Club career
He made his debut for the main squad of PFC CSKA Moscow on 20 September 2017 in a Russian Cup game against FC Avangard Kursk. He made his second appearance on 10 October 2018 in a Russian Cup game against FC Tyumen.

On 22 February 2019, Oleynikov had joined Fakel Voronezh on loan until the end of the season. He made his Russian Football National League debut for Fakel on 3 March 2019 in a game against FC Khimki.

On 19 June 2019, Oleynikov left CSKA Moscow to join Shinnik Yaroslavl on a permanent transfer.

On 2 July 2022, Oleynikov signed with Russian Premier League club FC Akhmat Grozny for one year with an option to extend for three more years. He made his RPL debut for Akhmat on 16 July 2022 against FC Spartak Moscow.

Career statistics

Club

References

External links
 

1998 births
People from Podolsk
Living people
Russian footballers
Association football midfielders
PFC CSKA Moscow players
FC Fakel Voronezh players
FC Shinnik Yaroslavl players
FC Chayka Peschanokopskoye players
FC Akhmat Grozny players
Russian First League players
Russian Premier League players
Sportspeople from Moscow Oblast